Elections for the 17th Knesset were held in Israel on 28 March 2006. The voting resulted in a plurality of seats for the then-new Kadima party, followed by the Labor Party, and a major loss for the Likud party.

After the election, the government was formed by the Kadima, Labor, Shas, and Gil parties, with the Yisrael Beiteinu party joining the government later. The Prime Minister was Ehud Olmert, leader of Kadima, who had been the acting prime minister going into the election.

Background

2003 election and later developments
In the 2003 elections, Likud, under the leadership of Prime Minister Ariel Sharon, achieved a convincing win by Israeli standards, winning 38 seats in the 120-member Knesset (parliament), with Sharon perceived as tough anti-terrorist leader on the wings of his 2002 Operation Defensive Shield. Labor, led by Amram Mitzna under slogans for "disengagement" from Gaza, won only 19 seats and did not initially join the new government.

Following the 2003 elections Likud suffered severe divisions over several positions taken by Sharon, most notably his adoption of a plan to withdraw Israeli settlers and troops from the Gaza Strip. This was exactly the position taken by Labor and denounced as being defeatist by Sharon prior to the 2003 elections, so it caused tension within the Likud party and in January 2005 Shimon Peres led Labor into a coalition with Sharon to allow the Gaza withdrawal to proceed despite opposition from a majority of Likud members.

Fall of the Likud-led government
As of the fall of 2005, Peres's Labor Party was providing the votes necessary for the Likud-led 30th Government to maintain its majority support in the Knesset. In Labor's internal leadership election scheduled for early November, Amir Peretz campaigned for the party leadership on a platform that included withdrawing Labor from the Sharon-led coalition. Peretz narrowly defeated Peres in the leadership election on November 9, 2005, and two days later all Labor ministers resigned from the Cabinet and Labor withdrew its support for the Government, leaving it without majority support in the Knesset.

Negotiations between Sharon and Peretz set the election date for 28 March 2006. "I'm letting him [Sharon] choose a date in that period between the end of February and the end of March and whatever date he chooses is acceptable to me, the earlier the better," Peretz said at the time. Sharon said: "As soon as it became clear that the existing political framework was falling apart, I came to the conclusion that the best thing for the country is to hold new elections as soon as possible."

Likud split and the formation of Kadima
The impending elections raised the prospect of a leadership election within Likud, with former Prime Minister Binyamin Netanyahu expected to challenge Sharon for the party leadership. In late November, Sharon and a number of other Likud ministers and Knesset members announced that they were leaving Likud to form a new, more centrist party, which was eventually named Kadima. The formation of Kadima turned the election into a three-way race among the new party, Labor and Likud, marking a shift from Israel's tradition of elections dominated by two major parties.

Although Kadima was formed primarily of former Likud members, Peres (having lost the Labor leadership election to Peretz) also announced his support for the new party, and later officially left Labor. Peres cited Sharon's leadership skills as a reason for his party switch.

Polls taken through the end of 2005 showed Sharon's Kadima Party enjoying a commanding lead over both Labor and Likud.

Party leadership and list selections

Sharon, as founder of Kadima and incumbent Prime Minister, was universally expected to lead the new party into the March 2006 election. However, on 4 January 2006, Sharon suffered a haemorrhagic stroke, leaving him in a coma. On 31 January 2006, Kadima submitted its list of candidates, with Sharon excluded from the list due to his inability to sign the necessary documents to be a candidate. Ehud Olmert who had become Acting Prime Minister and acting chairman of Kadima when Sharon became incapacitated, now officially became the new party's candidate for Prime Minister. Peres was placed second on Labor's list of candidates. Foreign Minister Tzipi Livni was placed third on the Kadima list, with the understanding that she would be the senior Vice Premier if Kadima formed the next government.

In the Shinui primaries, Tel Aviv council member Ron Levintal defeated Avraham Poraz for the number 2 spot. Poraz, a close ally of party leader Yosef Lapid, subsequently resigned from Shinui, as did most Shinui Knesset members, forming a breakaway party called Hetz (ha-Miflaga ha-Hilonit Tzionit or 'the Secular Zionist Party'). Lapid resigned as party leader on 25 January 2006, and Leventhal was subsequently elected the new party leader. Neither Shinui nor Hetz received sufficient votes to win any seats in the 17th Knesset. Shinui had won 15 seats in the 2003 election and was the third largest party in the 16th Knesset.

On 30 January 2006 the right-wing National Union (Halchud HaLeumi), a coalition of three small parties (Moledet, Tkuma, Tzionut Datit Leumit Mitchadeshet), submitted a joint list with the National Religious Party. The merged list is headed by Binyamin Elon.  The largely Russian immigrant Israel Beytenu (Israel Is Our Home) party has separated from National Union and is running a separate list.

This separation occurred following polls that predicted that, when running separately, these two major rightist blocs would receive between 20 and 25 seats (in the previous elections, they had received only 7), and it turned out to be true: the National Union bloc received 9 seats and Israel Beytenu received 11.

Likud selected Netanyahu as its leader, over then-Defense Minister Silvan Shalom. At Netanyahu's insistence, Shalom and the other remaining Likud ministers resigned from the Olmert-led government in January 2006.

Polls conducted from January through March showed Kadima still enjoying a substantial lead, though somewhat reduced from polls taken under Sharon's leadership.

Key issues

The Israeli–Palestinian conflict

Fighting Palestinian militancy

During the al-Aqsa Intifada, more than a thousand Israelis were killed in Palestinian militant attacks. Israel's security policy during that time was focused on arresting or killing members of the militant organizations, through frequent military excursions into the Palestinian territories and (somewhat controversially) targeted killings, and to curb the movement of suspected militants – especially would-be suicide bombers – through the use of checkpoints. This policy won the support of the Jewish mainstream, but elements in the Jewish left, as well as the vast majority of the Arab population, vehemently opposed what they saw as excessive response to the security threat. Some claimed that Israel's policy was in fact encouraging more violence from the Palestinian side.
Despite the decrease in violence during 2005 and 2006, or perhaps because of it, popular support for the security policy remained high among the Israeli public, which continued to fear suicide bombings and Qassam rocket attacks.

During the 2006 electoral campaign, the center and right parties vowed to continue the relentless fight against the Palestinian militants. Even Labor, which was traditionally known for its dovish views, put "combating terrorism" at the top of its agenda on the Conflict. Opposition to the current security policy, especially the use of targeted killings and the existence of checkpoints on Palestinian soil, comes mainly from Jewish left parties such as Meretz and from the Arab parties.

Solutions to the conflict
In the wake of the disengagement plan, the political field in Israel split into two roughly distinct groups: those who are in favour of withdrawing from most or all of the West Bank (unofficially nicknamed "Blues"), and those who wish for that area to remain under Israeli control (so-called "Orange"). In particular, Ariel Sharon and his faction left Likud to form Kadima because of their support of ending Israeli control over the West Bank. However, the two groups are also divided internally as to what practical steps need to be taken during the next few years.

Meretz supported bilateral negotiations as the only path towards peace.
Labor and Kadima both advocated further negotiations, but the supposed non-existence of a partner for peace on the Palestinian side (following Hamas victory in the 2006 Palestinian elections) brings them to strongly consider "shaping Israel's permanent borders" through a unilateral withdrawal from most of the West Bank, leaving in place the large settlement blocs and the Jewish neighbourhoods in East Jerusalem. These borders will be marked by the completed separation barrier. Kadima leader Ehud Olmert used the term "Convergence Plan" (תכנית ההתכנסות).
Yisrael Beytenu supported continued Israeli control of most settlements, but offers to cede some Israeli Arab cities and uninhabited territories to the Palestinian Authority in exchange.
Likud advocated an expansion of the separation barrier to include more territory on the Israeli side, and continued Israeli control of the Jordan Valley, the whole of Jerusalem and the settlement blocs.
National Union-National Religious Party vehemently opposed any more unilateral withdrawals, and supports the strengthening of Jewish settlements in the West Bank.
Herut – The National Movement and the Jewish National Front, two fringe nationalist groups, supported a massive population transfer of the Arabs under Israeli control – both Palestinians and Israeli citizens – to neighbouring Arab countries as a solution to the conflict. While Herut supports "voluntary transfer" through the creation of a compensation mechanism, the Front does not rule out forced transfer.

Economic and social issues

Since Israel's establishment, the political scene has been dominated by security and peace issues. The major parties were mainly divided by the different approaches with regard to the Arab–Israeli and Israeli–Palestinian conflicts.

The 2006 elections mark the first time a major party – the Labor Party – has placed economic and social issues on top of its agenda. This is mainly attributed to Amir Peretz's surprise victory over Shimon Peres in the November 2005 Labor leadership election; Peretz had left the party a few years earlier to form the socialist One Nation, which had only recently merged into Labor.

Labor's social democratic approach, which includes promises to raise the minimum wage and allocate a pension for every worker, now stands in sharp contrast to the neo-liberal agenda promoted by Likud leader Binyamin Netanyahu. Serving as Finance Minister from 2003 to 2005, Netanyahu led a policy that encouraged economic growth and lower taxes at the expense of Israel's long-running welfare mechanism. This has alienated him from many Likud supporters, which traditionally hail from the lower and middle classes. In the campaign, Netanyahu claimed to have done this to "save the Israeli economy from collapse."

In addition to Labor, the orthodox religious Shas, which has always claimed to champion the poor in Israeli society, also attacked Netanyahu's policies during the campaign, as did a number of small (and often new) socialist parties.

Israel as a Jewish and democratic state

Relations between Jewish Law (Halacha) and the state
From 1948 to 2003, religious parties played a part in every coalition formed in Israel. Zionist religious parties focused on maintaining the balance between observants and seculars in issues such as education, Kashrut, keeping the Sabbath, and matrimonial law, while Haredi parties demanded funds for religious scholars and the continued exemption of their followers from military service (decided on by David Ben-Gurion in 1951.) All of this alienated many secular Israelis, who felt their personal freedoms were being infringed upon, and that they were unfairly carrying most of the burden. This led to the rise of Shinui, which at the 2003 elections won 15 out of 120 seats and joined Ariel Sharon's coalition. Shinui failed in making significant changes to the status quo on religious issues, and quit the government in 2005 after Sharon decided to transfer funds to the ultra-Orthodox United Torah Judaism party. An internal quarrel caused most Knesset members from Shinui to form a new party (Hetz); both parties ran in the 2006 elections, although neither of them received any mandates.

Shinui, Hetz, Meretz, and Ale Yarok wish to promote what they see as key secular and democratic principles:
Allowing businesses to remain open, and public transportation to operate, during the Sabbath;
Abolishing the Orthodox monopoly on conducting marriage and divorce between Jewish couples (which in fact prevents some couples from getting married in Israel) by instituting civil marriage, including for same-sex couples;
Allowing the public sale of pork (forbidden under Kashrut laws);
Committing ultra-Orthodox religious scholars to military service.

The various religious parties, both Zionist (National Religious Party) and Haredi (Shas, United Torah Judaism) strictly oppose these changes. They wish to see Israel's Jewish character strengthened through further enforcement of the Sabbath and changes in the educational system.

Relations between Jews and Arabs
Israeli Arabs constitute roughly 20% of the population in Israel. Many Israeli-Arab groups claim continued institutional and social discrimination against them in Israel. Because they are not Jews and many identify ethnically with Palestinians their identity often clashes with their citizenship in the Jewish state. There are large disparities in general living standard and education between Israeli Arabs and the non-Arab Israeli population; they also have a lower participation rate in the workforce.  Discrimination and a lower proportion of females in the workforce are often cited as reasons for this. 

The Arab parties, the largest of which are the United Arab List, Balad and Hadash (a Jewish-Arab communist party, with mostly Arab composition and electorate), advocate abolition of all forms of ethnic inequality, and the establishment of a democratic bi-national state.

Procedures

Elections to the Knesset allocate 120 seats by party-list proportional representation, using the d'Hondt method. The election threshold for the 2006 election was set at 2% (up from 1.5% in previous elections), which is a little over two seats.

After official results are published, the President of Israel delegates the task of forming a government to the Member of Knesset with the best chance of assembling a majority coalition (usually the leader of the largest party.) That designee has up to 42 days to negotiate with the different parties, and then present their government to the Knesset for a vote of confidence. Once the government is approved (by a vote of at least 61 members), they becomes Prime Minister.

Parliament factions

The table below lists the parliamentary factions represented in the 16th Knesset.

Extraparliamentary parties

Note: traditional left-right divisions in Israel are different from in most countries, being mostly based on the different positions with regard to security and the Israeli–Palestinian conflict. For example, the left-wing Meretz-Yachad mainly advocates negotiations with the Palestinians along the lines of the Geneva Initiative, while the right-wing National Union is opposed to any territorial concessions, yet both parties have strong histories of tabling social/welfare laws.

Pre-election opinion polling
Numbers in the table below are seats, out of a total of 120, as predicted by opinion polls prior to the election.

As the electoral threshold stood at 2%, it was impossible for a party to receive only one seat in the Knesset.

Note: Most Israeli pollsters lump the "Arab" parties together, so that the listed number is the total number of seats that the three main Arab lists (Raam, Balad, Hadash) were expected to obtain. In the event that one or more of the three lists would not have passed the 2% threshold, the representation of these parties would have been one to three fewer seats than listed by the polls.

1 National Union and Yisrael Beiteinu together have 7 seats.

2 Dahaf – published in Yedioth Ahronoth (and/or its affiliate site Ynet) with the remark "The votes of the undecided were assigned to parties on the basis of additional questions."

Results
Voter turnout was the lowest in the history of Knesset elections, with only 63.6% of eligible voters voting. Turnout was down from  68.9% in 2003 and 78.7% in 1999. However, it was higher than the 62.5% in the 2001 elections for Prime Minister.

By city

Immediate impact and coalition formation
For the second time in Israeli history (previously in 1999), no dominant party sat in the Knesset, only two medium (Kadima and Labor) and small-sized ones. Following the election Olmert stated that he prefers entering into a coalition with Labor, and that Peretz is a "suitable partner."

On 2 April both Gil and Meretz recommended to Katzav that Olmert become Prime Minister. The next day, at a joint appearance, Olmert and Peretz announced that Kadima and Labor would be coalition partners and that Peretz would advise the President to tap Olmert as Prime Minister.

On 6 April President Katzav formally asked Olmert to form a government officially making him Prime Minister-designate. A coalition government was formed consisting of Kadima, Labor, Shas and Gil. Olmert refused to accede to Peretz's demands for the Finance ministry, who was forced to accept the Defense ministry instead.

In October 2006 with the coalition shaken after the 2006 Lebanon War, Olmert brought the right-wing Yisrael Beiteinu into government as well. However, they left the coalition in January 2008 in protest at peace talks with the Palestinian National Authority.

According to the Congressional Research Service: The March 28, 2006, Knesset election results were surprising in many respects. The voter turnout of 63.2% was the lowest ever. The contest was widely viewed as a referendum on Kadima’s plans to disengage from the West Bank, but it also proved to be a vote on economic policies that many believed had harmed the disadvantaged. Kadima came in first, but by a smaller margin than polls had predicted. Labor, emphasizing socioeconomic issues, came in a respectable second. Likud lost 75% of its votes from 2003 because Kadima drained off supporters. Its decline also was due to Netanyahu, whose policies as Finance Minister were blamed for social distress and whose opposition to unilateral disengagement was unpopular with an increasingly pragmatic, non-ideological electorate.

See also
Party lists for the 2006 Israeli legislative election
List of 17th Knesset members
2006 Israeli Labor Party primary

Notes

References

External links

Historical overview of the Seventeenth Knesset Knesset website
All the parties running for the 17th Knesset
Elections for the 17th Knesset Knesset website
Opinion polls
Election Polls from the Official Israeli Media

Israeli legislative
Legislative election
Legislative elections in Israel
March 2006 events in Asia
Israel
Ehud Olmert
Benjamin Netanyahu